Nepotilla vera is a species of sea snail, a marine gastropod mollusk in the family Raphitomidae.

Description
The length of the shell attains 2 mm, its diameter 1.2 mm.

Distribution
This marine species is endemic to New Zealand and occurs off Northland

References

 Powell, A.W.B. 1979 New Zealand Mollusca: Marine, Land and Freshwater Shells, Collins, Auckland
 Spencer, H.G., Marshall, B.A. & Willan, R.C. (2009). Checklist of New Zealand living Mollusca. Pp 196-219. in: Gordon, D.P. (ed.) New Zealand inventory of biodiversity. Volume one. Kingdom Animalia: Radiata, Lophotrochozoa, Deuterostomia. Canterbury University Press, Christchurch.

External links
 Spencer H.G., Willan R.C., Marshall B.A. & Murray T.J. (2011). Checklist of the Recent Mollusca Recorded from the New Zealand Exclusive Economic Zone
 

vera
Gastropods described in 1940
Gastropods of New Zealand